The 1880 United States presidential election in New Jersey took place on November 2, 1880, as part of the 1880 United States presidential election. Voters chose nine representatives, or electors to the Electoral College, who voted for president and vice president.

New Jersey voted for the Democratic nominee, Winfield Scott Hancock, over the Republican nominee, James A. Garfield. Hancock won the state by a very narrow margin of 0.82 percentage points.

A Democratic candidate would again not win New Jersey while losing the national popular vote until 2004.

Results

Results by county

References

New Jersey
1880
1880 New Jersey elections